Kennedy Club is a 2019 Indian Tamil language sports film written and directed by Suseenthiran. The film was produced by D. N. Thaisaravanan under the banner of Nallusamy Pictures. Sasikumar, Bharathiraja and Meenakshi Govindarajan plays the lead roles. The cinematography and editing was handled by R. B. Gurudev and Antony, respectively. D. Imman composed music for the film.

The film was theatrically released on 22 August 2019.

Plot 
Savarimuthu (Bharathiraja) is an ex-army man but he spends most of his life earnings to train the underprivileged yet skilled women kabaddi players in the village. Muruganandham (M. Sasikumar) is a former student of Savarimuthu, and he is now working in Railways through the sports quota. When Savarimuthu suffers from a sudden heart attack, Muruganandham is immediately called to lead the team.

Cast 

 Sasikumar as Muruganadham
 Bharathiraja as Savarimuthu
Meenakshi Govindarajan as Meenkashi
 Soori as Subramani
 Murali Sharma as Mukesh Rathore
 Neethu 
 Sowmya 
 Meenakshi
 Soundarya as Eeswari
 Asha as Regina
Chetan
 Smrithi
 Pillayar Ruthru
 Hasna
Vidya 
Vrinda 
 Florent Pereira

Production 
This film is a sport and political thriller directed by Susienthiran. The filming was completed in March 2019.

Marketing and release
The official trailer of the film was launched by Saregama on 31 July 2019.

The film was released theatrically on 22 August 2019.

Soundtrack 

The soundtrack of the film is composed by D. Imman, with lyrics by Viveka.

References

External links
 

2010s Tamil-language films
2010s sports drama films
Indian sports drama films
Films directed by Suseenthiran
Films scored by D. Imman
2019 drama films
2019 films
Films about women's sports
Kabaddi in India